Alan Leonardo "Leo" Díaz (born 27 January 2000) is an Argentine professional footballer who plays at Las Vegas Lights as a goalkeeper.

Career

Club

River Plate
Díaz joined the youth academy of River Plate in 2007. He was the 5th goalkeeper for the club when he got called up to the senior team for the first time on 16 May 2021. The 4 first-choice goalkeepers tested positive for COVID-19, forcing Díaz to start for River Plate in a Argentine Primera División match against their rivals Boca Juniors in the Superclásico. Díaz  made several saves, and the game was 1–1 before heading to overtime; Díaz made a penalty save, but River Plate ended up losing 4–2 in penalties. On 17 June 2021, he signed his first professional contract with the club until December 2024.

Las Vegas Lights

On February 15, 2023, Diaz joined the American team Las Vegas Lights of the USL Championship.

References

External links
 

Living people
2000 births
Sportspeople from Lanús
Argentine footballers
Association football goalkeepers
Club Atlético River Plate footballers
Argentine Primera División players
Las Vegas Lights FC players